Rakiroa is a monotypic genus of amphipods belonging to the monotypic family Rakiroidae. The only species is Rakiroa rima. Both genus and species were first described in 1982 by James K. Lowry and Graham David Fenwick.

The species is found in New Zealand.

References

Corophiidea
Monotypic crustacean genera
Taxa named by James K. Lowry